Wendela Boreel (1895–1985) was a British artist noted for her gouache painting method and intaglio works.  She was a student of Walter Sickert.

Training and early career 
The daughter of a Dutch diplomat, Jonkheer Boreel, and an American mother, Edith Margaret (née Ives), Boreel grew up in England and attended the Slade School of Fine Art.  Boreel's first interest at Slade was in drawing. She began attending evening classes at the Westminster Technical Institute where she was discovered by Sickert. He gave her access to a studio in Mornington Crescent where she began painting.

Boreel's first solo exhibit was in 1919 at Walker's Gallery.  She also held shows at the New English Art Club and as part of Frank Rutter’s Allied Artists’ Association and the London Group. However, her earliest successes were in etching and she was elected to the Royal Society of Etchers in 1923.

Tite street 
Boreel and her parents lived on Tite Street and she became friends with Frank Schuster and met John Singer Sargent, James Abbott McNeill Whistler, Edward Elgar, Siegfried Sassoon, W. B. Yeats, Thomas Hardy, Roger Fry, Glyn Philpot and Martin Hardie.

"The hut" 
In 1919 Frank Schuster introduced Boreel to Leslie George Wylde (nicknamed Anzy), a cavalary officer who had lost a leg during the  Gallipoli Campaign. Boreel and Wylde married and Schuster invited them to live in "the Hut", his country estate in Bray, Berkshire.  Siegfried Sasson described Boreel as "delightful" and said she was "the only serious element" at Bray.  Boreel's etching of Sassoon is held at the Art Gallery of New South Wales. When Schuster died in 1927 he left the estate to Wylde and Boreel.

Later years 
Wylde died in 1935 and Boreel moved to France.  She escaped to the United States with her son at the onset of World War Two.  She returned to France after the war.

References

External links 
 Landscape in Nude, by Wendela Boreel

1895 births
1985 deaths
Alumni of the Slade School of Fine Art
Alumni of the Westminster School of Art
American women printmakers
20th-century American women artists
British expatriates in France
British emigrants to the United States